is a railway station operated by JR West on the Sanyō Main Line in Kudamatsu, Yamaguchi. It is located in central Kudamatsu, near the city hall.

History

25 September 1897: Station opens, as part of the Sanyō Railway.
1 December 1906: Station is transferred to Japanese Government Railways as a part of railway nationalization
1965: Current overhead station building completed
1 April 1987: Station operation is taken over by JR West after privatization of Japanese National Railways

Layout
The station has three tracks, with two tracks devoted to passenger use. The main station building is above the platforms.

Platforms

See also
 List of railway stations in Japan

External links

  

Railway stations in Japan opened in 1897
Sanyō Main Line
Stations of West Japan Railway Company
Hiroshima City Network
Railway stations in Yamaguchi Prefecture